Eric dos Santos Rodrigues (born 10 August 2000), known as Eric Ramires or Ramires, is a Brazilian professional footballer who plays as a midfielder for Red Bull Bragantino.

Club career

Bahia 
Born in Salvador, Bahia, Ramires joined Bahia's youth setup in 2011. He played regularly for the under-15 and under-17 sides, going on to win the Copa Red Ball, Copa Dois de Julho and Copa Metropolitana.

On 6 September 2018, Eric Ramires made his first team – and Série A – debut, starting in a 2–0 victory over Sport; by doing so, he became the first player born in 2000 to play for the club. On 15 September, his contract was extended until 2022.

On 21 September 2018, Ramires made his Copa Sudamericana debut, starting and scoring the opener in a 2–1 home defeat of Botafogo.

Basel 
On 2 September 2019, Ramires da Silva signed with Swiss club Basel. The club announced the loan for their 2019–20 season under manager Marcel Koller on their home page on that day. He played his domestic league debut for the club in the home game at the St. Jakob-Park on 25 September as Basel won 4–0 against Zürich. He was substituted in for the last seven minutes of the match.

The club announced that the contract with Ramires would not be prolonged on 5 September 2020. During his one season with the club Ramires played a total of 12 games for Basel without scoring a goal. Nine of these games were in the Swiss Super League, two in the UEFA Europa League and one was a friendly game.

International career
On 13 December 2018, Ramires was included in Brazil under-20s for the 2019 South American U-20 Championship.

Career statistics

References

External links
EC Bahia profile  

2000 births
Living people
Sportspeople from Salvador, Bahia
Association football midfielders
Brazilian footballers
Esporte Clube Bahia players
FC Basel players
Campeonato Brasileiro Série A players
Swiss Super League players
Red Bull Bragantino players
Brazil under-20 international footballers
Brazilian expatriate footballers
Brazilian expatriate sportspeople in Switzerland
Expatriate footballers in Switzerland